The MTV Movie Awards Mexico 2004 was hosted by Ilana Sod.

Winners and nominees

Favorite Movie
Asesino en Serio
Corazón de Melón
Ladies' Night
Nicotina
Sin ton ni Sonia

Favorite Actress
Ana de la Reguera as Ana - Ladies' Night
Cecilia Suárez as Renée - Sin Ton Ni Sonia
Ludwika Paleta as Fernanda - Corazón De Melón

Favorite Actor
Diego Luna as Lolo - Nicotina
José María Yazpik as Mauricio - Sin Ton Ni Sonia
Luis Roberto Guzmán as Roco - Ladies' Night

Best Song from a Movie
"Luz Azul (Fase Mix A)" — Aterciopelados (Nicotina)
"Desde Que Llegaste" — Reyli (Ladies' Night)
"Sonia" — Panteón Rococó (Sin ton ni Sonia)

Hottest Scene
The Cyber Voyeurism of Diego Luna - Nicotina
Mega Orgasm of Ivonne Montero - Asesino en Serio
Table Dance of Ana Claudia Talancón and Ana de la Reguera - Ladies' Night

Best Diego Luna in a Movie
As Button - Open Range
As Gastón - Soldados de Salamina
As Lolo - Nicotina

Worst Smoker
Tomás (Daniel Martínez) - Corazón de Melón
Lolo (Diego Luna) - Nicotina
Orlando (Juan Manuel Bernal) - Sin ton ni Sonia

Best Cameo
Darío T. Pié as Transvestite - Asesino en Serio
Jesús Ochoa as Churchman - Ladies' Night
José María Yazpik as Joaquín the Neighbor - Nicotina

Sexiest Hero
Ben Affleck as Matt Murdock - Daredevil
Keanu Reeves as Neo - The Matrix Reloaded
Orlando Bloom as Will Turner - Pirates of the Caribbean: The Curse of the Black Pearl

Sexiest Villain
Demi Moore as Madison Lee - Charlie's Angels: Full Throttle
Kristanna Loken as TX - Terminator 3: Rise of the Machines
Rebecca Romijn-Stamos as Mysthique - X2: X-Men United

Best Cinematography in a Video Scandal
René Bejarano or "Don't Close Me the Briefcase"
El niño verde or "Me Chamaquearon"
Gustavo Ponce or "Viva Las Vegas"

Best Colin Farrell in a Movie
as Bullseye - Daredevil
as James - The Recruit
as Jim - S.W.A.T.
as Stu - Phonebooth
as Extra - Verónica Guerin

Best Miracle in a Movie
The ear of Maleo (Jesus heals the ear cut off by Peter) - The Passion of the Christ (James Caviezel)
The wine at Caná (Jesus turns water into wine at a wedding) - The Last Temptation of Christ (Willem Dafoe)
The bust of Grace (Bruce makes the breasts bigger of his wife) - Bruce Almighty (Jim Carrey)

Best Look
Cameron Díaz as Natalie Cook - Charlie's Angels: Full Throttle
Reese Witherspoon as Elle Wood - Legally Blonde 2
Johnny Depp as Jack Sparrow - Pirates of the Caribbean: The Curse of the Black Pearl

Most Funniest "Gringo" in Japan
Bill Murray as Bob Harris - Lost in Translation
Tom Cruise as Nathan Algren - The Last Samurai
Uma Thurman as Black Mamba - Kill Bill: Volume 1

Legend Award
Rosa Gloria Chagoyán

MTV Movie & TV Awards